Joyride is a 2005 adventure mystery film from the Netherlands which featured the music from symphonic metal band Epica.

Main cast
Peggy Vrijens as Joy
Georgina Verbaan as Chantal
Tygo Gernandt as Tim
Dorien Haan as Roos
Don Clovis as Forester

Plot
Three girls steal an antique convertible car and head up for a model contest in Southern France. On the road, they discover an unconscious young man in the trunk. One of the girls confesses that she is responsible for it and that she plans to get rid of him.

Soundtrack
The album The Score – An Epic Journey by Epica is the soundtrack to the film.

References

External links
 

2000s crime films
2005 films
2000s Dutch-language films